The Land Titles Building is located at 350 12th Street East in Prince Albert, Saskatchewan, Canada.   The federal government architect Thomas Fuller designed the building.  The building is a designated Heritage Property.  After 1907 the building was repurposed as for a time used as a post office, an Anglican theology student's residence, an armoury for the 203rd Battalion of the Canadian Military, an employment agency, the winter office for the Prince Albert National Park, Federal Department of Agriculture offices and finally as a private residence.

References 

Government buildings completed in 1892
Buildings and structures in Prince Albert, Saskatchewan